RZM may refer to:

 Reichszeugmeisterei, supreme quartermaster office of Nazi Germany
 Reichsbahn-Zentralamt Maschinenbau, former Reichsbahn Central Office Engineering Works of Germany